Sons of Apollo is an American progressive metal supergroup formed in 2017 and composed of drummer Mike Portnoy, bassist Billy Sheehan, keyboardist Derek Sherinian, vocalist Jeff Scott Soto, and guitarist Ron "Bumblefoot" Thal.

History 
Sherinian and Portnoy played together in progressive metal band Dream Theater, from which Sherinian was asked to leave in 1999, while Portnoy later left in 2010. Sheehan and Portnoy formed rock group The Winery Dogs with Sheehan's former Mr. Big bandmate, Richie Kotzen. Portnoy, Sheehan, and Sherinian also worked together on a short-lived, live instrumental project with Tony MacAlpine called PSMS. Because of this, Portnoy considers MacAlpine to be part of Sons of Apollo's history as well as "part of the extended family". While touring, Sherinian asked Portnoy to join him in a full-time project. When Portnoy's schedule allowed, he agreed and suggested Soto and Bumblefoot to complete the line-up, having previously worked with Bumblefoot on Metal Allegiance and knowing Soto after his solo band opened several The Winery Dogs shows in South America. Members have insisted in multiple interviews that the supergroup is a full-time band, and not just a side project.

The name of the band was proposed by Sherinian after he scrolled through a list of suggestions by Portnoy and saw the word "Apollo" among them. It was picked due to Apollo being the god of music. But because the band suspected there could be another band called Apollo, they thought of possible variations and that's how their name was chosen.

Their debut album, Psychotic Symphony, was produced by Portnoy and Sherinian (as "The Del Fuvio Brothers") and was released on October 20, 2017 via Inside Out Music/Sony Music. On August 30, 2019, the band released their first live album Live with the Plovdiv Psychotic Symphony, filmed at the Plovdiv Roman theatre in Plovdiv, Bulgaria. Their second album MMXX was released on January 17, 2020.

Members

Current Lineup
 Jeff Scott Soto – lead vocals, acoustic guitar
 Ron "Bumblefoot" Thal – guitar, vocals
 Billy Sheehan – bass, vocals
 Derek Sherinian – keyboards, string arrangements
 Mike Portnoy – drums, percussion, vocals, co-lead vocals

Touring Members
 Felipe Andreoli – bass (2022)

Discography
Studio albums
 Psychotic Symphony (2017)
 MMXX (2020)

Live albums
 Live with the Plovdiv Psychotic Symphony (2019)
 
Extended plays
 Alive/Tengo Vida (2018)
 
Singles
 "Signs of the Time" (2017) 
 "Coming Home" (2017)
 "Just Let Me Breathe (Live)" (2019)
 "Labyrinth (Live)" (2019)
 "Goodbye Divinity" (2019)
 "Fall to Ascend" (2019)
 "Desolate July" (2020)
 "Asphyxiation" (2020)

References

External links
  - Seems to be down

American progressive metal musical groups
Musical groups established in 2017
2017 establishments in the United States
Rock music supergroups
Inside Out Music artists
Heavy metal supergroups